In enzymology, a succinate-CoA ligase (ADP-forming) is an enzyme that catalyzes the chemical reaction

ATP + succinate + CoA  ADP + phosphate + succinyl-CoA

The 3 substrates of this enzyme are ATP, succinate, and CoA, whereas its 3 products are ADP, phosphate, and succinyl-CoA.

This enzyme belongs to the family of ligases, specifically those forming carbon-sulfur bonds as acid-thiol ligases.  The systematic name of this enzyme class is succinate:CoA ligase (ADP-forming). Other names in common use include succinyl-CoA synthetase (ADP-forming), succinic thiokinase, succinate thiokinase, succinyl-CoA synthetase, succinyl coenzyme A synthetase (adenosine diphosphate-forming), succinyl coenzyme A synthetase, A-STK (adenin nucleotide-linked succinate thiokinase), STK, and A-SCS.  This enzyme participates in 4 metabolic pathways: Citric acid cycle, propanoate metabolism, c5-branched dibasic acid metabolism, and reductive carboxylate cycle (CO2 fixation).

Structural studies

References

 Boyer, P.D., Lardy, H. and Myrback, K. (Eds.), The Enzymes, 2nd ed., vol. 6, Academic Press, New York, 1962, p. 387-399.
 
 

EC 6.2.1
Enzymes of known structure